Revadikoppa is a village in the Belgaum district of the southwestern state of Karnataka, India.

References

Villages in Belagavi district